The Midwest Athletic Association was an intercollegiate athletic conference of historically black colleges and universities (HBCUs) that existed from 1926 to 1970. It was later known as the Midwest Conference from 1962 to 1963 and as the Midwestern Conference from 1964 to 1970. The conference's membership was widespread due to the lack of HBCUs in the Midwest, with members located in Arkansas, Kentucky, Louisiana, Mississippi, Missouri, Ohio, Tennessee, West Virginia, and Texas.

Members

 Known as Bluefield Institute until 1931.
 Known as Kentucky State Industrial College until 1938.
 Known as West Virginia Institute until 1929.
 Team name was Green Wave until 1947.
 Known as Tennessee A&I State College until 1968.
 Known as Wilberforce State College until 1951, and Central State College until 1965.
 Known as Green Wave until 1951.

Football champions

Midwest Athletic Association

1926 – Wilberforce
1927 – Bluefield
1928 – Bluefield
1929 – Wilberforce
1930 – Wilberforce
1931 – Wilberforce
1932 – Kentucky State
1933 – Wilberforce
1934 – Kentucky State
1935 – Wilberforce
1936 – West Virginia State
1937 – Kentucky State

1938 – Kentucky State
1939 – Wilberforce
1940 – Wilberforce
1941 – Kentucky State
1942 – Kentucky State
1943 – No champion
1944 – No champion
1945 – Tennessee A&I
1946 – Tennessee A&I
1947 – Tennessee A&I
1948 – Wilberforce State
1949 – Tennessee A&I

1950 – Wilberforce State
1951 – Wilberforce State
1952 – Lincoln (MO) and Texas Southern
1953 – Lincoln (MO)
1954 – Tennessee A&I
1955 – Grambling
1956 – Tennessee A&I
1957 – Jackson State and Tennessee A&I
1958 – Lincoln (MO)
1959 – Tennessee A&I
1960 – Tennessee A&I
1961 – Tennessee A&I

Midwest Conference
1962 – Lincoln (MO)
1963 – Tennessee A&I

Midwestern Conference
1964 – Tennessee A&I
1965 – Tennessee A&I
1966 – Tennessee A&I

See also
List of defunct college football conferences
Southern Intercollegiate Athletic Conference (SIAC)
Southwestern Athletic Conference (SWAC)

References

 
College sports in Kentucky
College sports in Louisiana
College sports in Mississippi
College sports in Missouri
College sports in Ohio
College sports in Tennessee
College sports in West Virginia